Haruo Okada (June 14, 1914 – November 6, 1991) was a Japanese politician. He was a member of the Socialist Party of Japan. He was a member of the House of Representatives of Japan for the multi-member constituency Hokkaido's 4th district. He was a recipient of the Order of the Rising Sun. He served alongside Seiichi Ikehata, Tatsuo Takahashi and Shōichi Watanabe.

External links
そらち産業遺産と観光 元衆議院副議長岡田春夫の生家

1914 births
1991 deaths
Japanese politicians
Japanese socialists
People from Hokkaido
Grand Cordons of the Order of the Rising Sun